Patrick Michael Kelly (9 April 1918 – 7 September 1985) was an Irish professional footballer who played as a goalkeeper, spending most of his career with Barnsley and making one international appearance for Ireland.

Football career
Kelly was born in Johannesburg, South Africa and played his youth football with the Pirates club in Bloemfontein before moving to Scotland to join Aberdeen.

At the end of the Second World War he joined Barnsley of the Football League Second Division where he was to remain for the next six years, making over 150 appearances.

Kelly made his solitary international appearance in a World Cup qualifier against Scotland on 1 October 1949; another international débutante in that match was his Barnsley team-mate, Danny Blanchflower. With just over half an hour played, the Scots were five goals up and although the Irish managed to score twice in the second half (through Sammy Smyth), the final score was 8–2 to Scotland. Kelly was never selected for Northern Ireland again, with his namesake, Hugh Kelly of Fulham replacing him, only to concede nine goals against England in the next match.

Kelly was released by Barnsley in February 1952, and dropped into Division Three (North) with Crewe Alexandra. He stayed for a little over a season at Gresty Road before retiring from professional football.

References

External links

1918 births
1985 deaths
Soccer players from Johannesburg
Association footballers from Northern Ireland
Association football goalkeepers
Pre-1950 IFA international footballers
Aberdeen F.C. players
Barnsley F.C. players
Crewe Alexandra F.C. players
Dumbarton F.C. wartime guest players
English Football League players
South African emigrants to the United Kingdom